Ottoman Ukraine, Khan Ukraine, Hanshchyna is an historical term for right-bank Ukraine (as well as for the southern regions of the Kiev Voivodeship) - also known by its Turkic name Yedisan. The first recorded use of the term Khanska Ukraina are traced to 1737 when the Russian secret-agent Lupul was urging to attack Ottoman Ukraine.

History
Officially, the southern, coastal edge of territory had been occupied by the Crimean Khanate since the 1520s in order to enable the slave raidings. The territory appeared as a consequence of the 1667 Truce of Andrusovo, which divided the Cossack Hetmanate, without consideration of the local population between the Polish–Lithuanian Commonwealth and the Tsardom of Russia. Since 1669, the Ottoman authorities granted protectorate to the Cossack statehood west of the Dnieper and designated it into a separate sanjak which was headed by Cossack Hetman Petro Doroshenko. It was confirmed by the Treaty of Buchach in 1672.

The territory was bordered to its west by Podolia Eyalet and its south by Silistra Eyalet. With the help of Petro Doroshenko, the Ottomans were able to occupy Podilia and established its province in 1672. In 1676 the new King of Poland, Jan III Sobieski, managed to recover some of the lost territories of Ukraine and stopped paying a tribute after signing the Truce of Zhuravno. Also in 1676, Ivan Samoylovych, along with the boyar Grigory Romodanovsky, led a successful campaign against Doroshenko forcing him to surrender and occupied the Cossack capital, Chyhyryn. Between 1677 and 1678 a powerful army of Ibrahim Pasha fought over the control of Chyhyryn (see Russo-Turkish War (1676–81)). Eventually, the army of the Grand Vizier Kara Mustafa Pasha was successful in taking control over Chyhyryn, in 1678. The city of Nemyriv became the Hetman residence between the 1670s and 1699.

After the 1681 Treaty of Bakhchisarai, Ottoman Ukraine came under the government of Moldavia by Hospodar George Ducas.

In 1685, Polish king John III Sobieski revived some Cossack freedoms in right-bank Ukraine and signed the Eternal Peace Treaty of 1686 with Russia securing an alliance against the Ottoman Empire.

Sanjak-beys

 1669–1676 Petro Doroshenko
 1678–1681 Yuriy Khmelnytsky
 1681–1684 George Ducas
 1684–1685 Teodor Sulymenko
 1685–1685 Yakym Samchenko
 1685–1685 Yuriy Khmelnytsky
 1685–1695 Stepan Lozynsky
 1695–1698 Ivan Bahaty
 1698–1699 Petro Ivanenko

Most of Ottoman Ukraine became part of the Crimean Khanate (under protectorate of the Russian Empire) in 1774 except for the Ochakiv region which remained part of the Ottoman Empire.

See also
 Danubian Sich
 Metropolitan of Braila
 Black Sea Cossack Host

References

Sources
 Sapozhnikov, I. Zaporizhian Cossacks of the Ochakiv region and Ottoman Ukraine during the "Crimean protection" (1711–1734). History of Cossacks portal.
 Hrybovsky, V. Ottoman Ukraine. The Ukrainian Week. August 7, 2009

Ottoman period in Ukraine
Subdivisions of the Ottoman Empire
Geographic history of Ukraine
Historical regions in Ukraine
17th century in Ukraine
17th century in the Ottoman Empire
Cossack Hetmanate
Turkey–Ukraine relations
Vassal states of the Ottoman Empire
Ottoman Empire